Frank Edward Bachhuber (November 17, 1884 – February 28, 1939) was an American politician, lawyer, and businessman.

Early life
Frank E. Bachhuber was born on November 17, 1884, in Farmersville, Wisconsin, to Louise (nee Sterr) and Andrew Bachhuber. He graduated from Mayville High School in 1902. Bachhuber graduated from Marquette University in 1907 and the American Institute of Banking in 1912.

Career
In 1922, he moved to Wausau, Wisconsin. He was an attorney for Marshall and Ilsley Bank in Milwaukee, Wisconsin. He practiced law in Wausau and was involved with the banking, loans, and mortgages businesses.

He was elected to the Wisconsin State Assembly in 1932 as a Democrat.

Personal life
Bachhuber married Mabel Foley of Dodge County, Wisconsin, on July 3, 1912. Together, they had four children, including Ruth Bachhuber Doyle, who also served in the Wisconsin Assembly.

Death
Bachhuber died on February 28, 1939, in Wausau. He is buried in Mayville.

Notes

1884 births
1939 deaths
People from Dodge County, Wisconsin
Politicians from Wausau, Wisconsin
Marquette University alumni
Businesspeople from Wisconsin
Wisconsin lawyers
20th-century American politicians
20th-century American businesspeople
20th-century American lawyers
Democratic Party members of the Wisconsin State Assembly